Staircase effect may refer to:

 Bowditch effect, arising from an increased heart rate
 "Jaggies", artifacts in computer graphics